Carlyne is both a given name that is a variant of Carly and Caroline. Notable people with the name include:

Arthur Carlyne Niven Dixey, full name of Arthur Dixey (1889 – 1954), British Member of Parliament
Carlyne Cerf de Dudzeele, French stylist, art director and photographer

See also

Carlyn
Carolyne
Carline
Carlyle (disambiguation)
Carbyne (disambiguation)